The following lists events that happened during 1900 in the Kingdom of Denmark.

Incumbents
 Monarch – Christian IX
 Prime minister – Hugo Egmont Hørring (until 27 April), Hannibal Sehested (council president)

Events

 27 April — The Cabinet of Sehested is formed by Hannibal Sehested of the conservative party after Hugo Egmont Hørring's resignation as Council President.
 6 May  The Christ Church on Enghave Plads in Copenhagen is inaugurated.
 8 May — Sankt Lukas Stiftelsen is founded by Isabelle Brockenhuus-Løwenhielm and pastor Vilhelm Kold from Indre Mission.
 18 May — The Danish Unitarian Church Society is founded as Det Fri Kirkesamfund.

Sports
 2 July  Boldklubben Union is founded.
 10 December  Hellerup IK is founded.

Births
 11 April – Kai Normann Andersen, composer and film score composer (d. 1967)
 6 May – Vilhelm Hansen, cartoonist and illustrator (d. 1992)
 16 May – Aage Winther-Jørgensen, actor (d. 1967)
 27 July – Knud, Hereditary Prince of Denmark (d. 1976)
 8 September – Alice O'Fredericks, film director (d. 1968)
 29 November – Jørgen-Frantz Jacobsen, author (d. 1958)

Deaths
 4 February – Albert Schou, photographer (b. 1849)
 1 March – Edvard Helsted, composer (b. 1816)
 10 March – Johan Peter Emilius Hartmann, composer (b. 1805)
 9 May – Carit Etlar, author (b. 1816)
 29 May – Carl Lange, physician and psychologist (b. 1834)
 18 June – Johan Kjeldahl, chemist (b. 1849)
 25 December – Holger Hvidtfeldt Jerichau, painter (b. 1861)

References

 
Denmark
Years of the 19th century in Denmark
1900s in Denmark
Denmark